"10-9-8" is the debut single by Face to Face, originally released in 1984 in the United States. It peaked at number 38 on the Billboard Hot 100 the week ending July 20, 1984 and number seven on the dance chart.

Track listing
12" Epic AS 1823
 "10-9-8" – 3:53
 "Out of My Hands" – 4:46

References

1984 debut singles
Songs written by Angelo Petraglia
1984 songs
Epic Records singles
Song recordings produced by Arthur Baker (musician)